The following list includes all current and former arenas used by current and defunct teams who once played in the American Basketball Association from 1967 to 1976.

ABA/NBA teams

Defunct teams

References

 
ABA
ABA
.ABA